Cinnamomum dubium, called wild cinnamon or wal kurundu in Sinhalese, is an evergreen tree originating in Sri Lanka. It is used as a timber tree.

References

 http://lauraceae.myspecies.info/category/lauraceae/lauraceae/cinnamomum/cinnamomum-dubium

External links
 http://indiabiodiversity.org/species/show/263486
 http://plants.jstor.org/specimen/k000778600

dubium
Endemic flora of Sri Lanka